William B. Jensen (born March 25, 1948 in Marshfield, Wisconsin) is an American chemist and chemical historian.

Jensen, son of a sign painter and librarian, went to school in Wausau, Wisconsin. He became interested in chemistry at an early age and, after reading Discovery of the Elements by Mary Elvira Weeks, he also became interested in the history of chemistry. He studied chemistry at the University of Wisconsin – Madison, taking a bachelor's degree in 1970, a master's degree in 1972 and a doctorate in inorganic chemistry in 1982. He was then appointed as assistant professor of inorganic chemistry at the Rochester Institute of Technology from 1983 to 1986, before becoming Oesper Professor of the History of Chemistry and Chemistry Education at the University of Cincinnati. There he is also curator of the Oesper Collection on the History of Chemistry, the largest such collection in the United States after that at the Smithsonian Museum.

He has an Ask the Historian column in the Journal of Chemical Education. From 1988 to 1995, he was the founding editor of the Bulletin for the History of Chemistry. As a chemical historian, he is primarily concerned with the history of physical and inorganic chemistry at the end of the 19th and beginning of the 20th centuries, as well as the history of chemical apparatus. He endeavours to bring the history of chemistry closer to more chemistry students, detached from the history of science.

Jensen is an article contributor to Encyclopedia Britannica. He is also a caricaturist for MeasureNet Technology Ltd.

In 1982, an influential article by Jensen appeared in the Journal of Chemical Education, suggesting that group 3 in the periodic table should contain lutetium and lawrencium instead of lanthanum and actinium. This question has been much debated in the literature. Jensen was a member of a 2015–2021 IUPAC project to decide on the composition of group 3, chaired by Eric Scerri; so far it has produced a provisional report (written by Scerri), which is in support of Jensen's 1982 conclusion.

Selected publications

References

External links
William B. Jensen's research while affiliated with University of Cincinnati and other places (ResearchGate)

University of Cincinnati faculty
University of Wisconsin–Madison alumni
20th-century American chemists
Living people
1948 births
Academic journal editors
Historians of chemistry
Scientists from Wisconsin
American historians of science
Historians from Wisconsin
People from Marshfield, Wisconsin
Rochester Institute of Technology faculty
People involved with the periodic table